Azuláo en Vivo con Lila Downs, (Azulao: Live with Lila Downs) is a live acoustic album of the Mexican singer Lila Downs. Recorded in April 1996 in Oaxaca City. This album is considered as one of the best of the artist. It opened the path to her commercial success in Mexico and the United States. Lila Downs achieved this success partly because this album was released in different parts of the Mexican Republic and was its first album to be released in CD.

In this album, she was accompanied and supported by well-known Mexican musicians who helped her interpret traditional music, country music and jazz. From songs like "Woke Up This Morning" to the "Lucky" Lila Downs interprets in Spanish and English compositions of Jaime Sabines, David Haro José Alfredo Jiménez Chuy Rasgado and Elpidio Ramirez.

Note that Downs produced this album in collaboration with Paul Cohen (Artistic Director of Lila) who considered arrangements necessary to perform the different pieces found on the album. It did not benefit from massive production since it was directly created and distributed directly by the artist. Only a limited number of copies now exist. Thus, it is not officially part of Lila Downs's discography it is available in digital format.

Track listing

External links
Lila Downs Azuláo

1996 live albums
Lila Downs albums